Mickleton, with a population of 1,677 (UK Census 2011), an increase of 125 since the census of 1991, is the northernmost village in Gloucestershire, England.

Location 
Mickleton lies close to the county border with Worcestershire and Warwickshire.

The village lies 8 miles south of Shakespeare's Stratford-upon-Avon at the western edge of the Cotswold escarpment in the Vale of Evesham. Chipping Campden lies 3 miles to the south.

Attractions 

Mickleton is noted for its market gardening and vegetable growing Young plants, seed plugs, apples, cauliflowers and asparagus, or gras, are grown locally. Meon Hill, scene of the so-called 'witchcraft' murder of Charles Walton in 1945, lies to the north of the village.  Meon Hill is said to have provided inspiration for Tolkien's 'Weathertop' from The Lord of the Rings According to legend, Meon Hill was formed by the Devil. He intended to throw a clod of earth at Evesham Abbey, but missed, and the earth formed the hill.

Mickleton has two old pubs, King's Arms and Butcher's Arms, and a hotel, Three Ways House Hotel.  Sited on a green in front of the hotel is a memorial fountain by the Victorian architect William Burges.

The Church of St Lawrence is an Anglican parish church. It contains a memorial to Utrecia Smith, the daughter of a curate of Mickleton whose father was also a schoolmaster. Utrecia had been the fiancée of the writer Richard Graves (who broke off their engagement); she died in 1744 aged 30. At the heart of village activities is King George's Hall, located at the centre of the village and home to the many clubs and societies that thrive in the village.

The Heart of England Way runs through the village. The village has many B&Bs that have been set up privately in people's own homes   Local market towns and villages include Broadway, Chipping Campden, Stratford-upon-Avon, Moreton-in-Marsh and Evesham.

Both Hidcote Manor Garden and Kiftsgate Court Gardens are located nearby.

Notable residents
Sir Anthony Keck (1630–1695), Commissioner of the Great Seal, was born in Mickleton.

References

External links 

King George's Hall Mickleton
Photos of Mickleton and surrounding area on geograph.org.uk
Mickleton village
Hidcote Bartrim & Hidcote Boyce are a mile away

Villages in Gloucestershire
Cotswold District
Cotswolds